Elections to the municipal and county councils of England, Wales, and Scotland were held in 1955.

Results

England

Wales

Scotland

1955 Borough elections
Summary of results
The results for the boroughs were:

See also
United Kingdom national and local elections
United Kingdom by-election records

References

 
1955